Kenneth Thomas Casanega (February 18, 1921 – October 10, 2021) was an American professional football player who was a quarterback for two seasons with the San Francisco 49ers of the National Football League (NFL). He played college football at Santa Clara University, having previously attended Castlemont High School in Oakland, California. He later was a school administrator.

College
Kenneth Casanega attended Santa Clara University from 1938-1942 and played halfback for the Broncos' football team. In 1965 he was inducted into the university's athletic hall of fame.

Naval service
Casanega was picked 3rd overall by the Pittsburgh Steelers at the 1942 National Football League Draft. He turned down the offer to serve his country as an U.S. Naval aviator during World War II. Lt. (j.g.) Casanega served as a flier aboard an aircraft carrier in the South Pacific, taking part in raids over the Philippines and around Japan.

AAFC 
Casanega joined the original San Francisco 49ers off the All-America Football Conference in 1946. He played in all 14 games as a running back, starting 5, with 29 rushes for 90 yards and 1 touchdown, plus 5 receptions for 102 yards and 1 touchdown. He also returned 18 points for a 13.8-yard average and three kicks for a 20.3 average. As a defensive back in 1946, he tallied 8 interceptions. In 1948 he played in 1 game, his last in the NFL, with no statistics.

Later life
Casanega became a school coach and administrator, and a principal for 15 years, at Napa High School. In the early 1970s he became superintendent in the Hollister School District in Hollister, California. He retired in 1981 and turned 100 in 2021. 

Upon the death of Cecil Souders on August 31, 2021, Casanega became the oldest living NFL player. Casanega died in Medford, Oregon on October 11, 2021, at the age of 100.

References

1921 births
2021 deaths
American football quarterbacks
American centenarians
Men centenarians
San Francisco 49ers players
Santa Clara Broncos football players
Players of American football from Oakland, California
People from Alameda County, California
United States Navy pilots of World War II
United States Navy officers